State Route 107 (SR-107) is a state highway in the U.S. state of Utah that spans  in West Point, connecting SR-110 and 3000 West. The highway is routed entirely on 300 North.

Route description
The route begins at the intersection of SR-110 (4500 West) and 300 North in West Point and heads east on the latter as a two-lane highway, ending at 3000 West, a distance of 1.5 miles. The remainder of the former route from this point east is now maintained by Davis County.

History
The state legislature created SR-107 in 1931, connecting SR-1 (US-91) near Clearfield with West Point; it was extended slightly west to SR-195 in 1945. Since then, although the routes at each end have changed (SR-1 is now SR-126 and SR-195 is now SR-110), SR-107 has retained the same alignment. However, due to a jurisdictional agreement between UDOT and Davis County in 2015, necessitated by the extension of SR-193 to 2000 West (SR-108), the eastern terminus of SR-107 is now located at 3000 West in West Point.

Major intersections

References

107
 107
Streets in Utah